Drosera banksii, commonly known as Banks' sundew, is a small annual species in the carnivorous plant genus Drosera. The reniform-shaped leaves are attached to petioles and arranged in a circular pattern (rosette) around the stem. The 5 mm wide flowers are white. It is native to northern Australia (Queensland, the Northern Territory, and Western Australia) and Southeast Asia (Papua New Guinea and Western New Guinea). D. banksii was originally described by Robert Brown and validly published by Augustin Pyramus de Candolle in 1824. It is currently classified in the subgenus Lasiocephala, but expert opinion is that it is misplaced and should be reclassified with the closely allied D. subtilis.

See also 
 List of Drosera species
 Taxonomy of Drosera

References

External links 

Caryophyllales of Australia
Carnivorous plants of Asia
Carnivorous plants of Australia
Eudicots of Western Australia
Flora of New Guinea
Flora of Queensland
Flora of the Northern Territory
Plants described in 1824
banksii